Anargyros Sotirakopoulos (born 21 February 1992) is a Greek male track cyclist, representing Greece at international competitions. He competed at the 2016 UEC European Track Championships in the 1 km time trial event.

References

1992 births
Living people
Greek male cyclists
Greek track cyclists
Place of birth missing (living people)
21st-century Greek people